Indru Netru Naalai is a 2015 Tamil-language science fiction comedy film written and directed by R. Ravikumar in his debut feature. The film is jointly produced by Thirukumaran Entertainment and Studio Green, and features Vishnu Vishal and Miya in the lead while Karunakaran, T. M. Karthik, P. Ravi Shankar and Jayaprakash play supporting roles. The film received positive reviews from critics.

Plot
In the year 2065, a scientist (Arya) invents a time machine. To prove its capability, he sends it back in time to 2015, programming it to return within forty seconds. However, the machine does not return.

The time machine is seen by three people in 2015 — Elango (Vishnu Vishal), a budding entrepreneur whose ideas are rejected by all and is struggling to maintain his relationship with his rich girlfriend Anu (Miya George), who is embarrassed at the fact that Elango is unemployed; Elango's best friend Pulivetti Arumugam (Karunakaran), a fake astrologer; and an inventor Giridhara Parthasarathy (T. M. Karthik), who makes a living by repairing home appliances. The three of them are involved in an accident and witness the time machine while recovering from the shock. While Parthasarathy decides to keep the time machine for himself, he suffers an electric shock and ends up in a coma, prompting Elango and Arumugam to steal the time machine from Parthasarathy's shop. The duo use the time machine to make Arumugam's astrology practice extremely successful by going back in time and finding things lost by people under the guise of astrology. Elango further uses the machine to impress Anu's industrialist father Rajarathinam (Jayaprakash) by going to the future, obtaining the stock market results and successfully "predicting" them in front of Rajarathinam and his company's board of directors. Rajarathinam soon approves the marriage of Anu with Elango.

Things go smoothly until Elango and Arumugam inadvertently thwart an encounter to kill Kuzhandaivelu (P. Ravi Shankar), a dreaded gangster and extortionist who is targeting Rajarathinam, during one of their trips to the past to find yet another item of Arumugam's client. In the present day, Kuzhandaivelu is plotting to kill Rajarathinam for his role in planning the encounter and also Elango and Arumugam for (unknowingly) attacking him in a parking lot. Elango and Anu's marriage is postponed indefinitely as a result.

Elango and Arumugam go back to the past to fix their mistake, but Kuzhandaivelu accidentally shoots the time machine while fighting a police officer during the encounter, damaging it. The duo find Parthasarathy, who has woken up from his coma but doesn't remember them, and ask him to fix the time machine. While Parthasarathy manages to fix the time machine, due to a lack of specific parts which have not yet been developed, it can only take the user to a specific time in the past (when Kuzhandaivelu damaged the time machine) and also as the date cannot be changed, the user cannot return to the future. Therefore, the duo decide not to use it. Later, Kuzhandaivelu spots Elango, Arumugam and Anu at a mall and pursues them. He opens fire during the chase, killing Anu. To ensure that Anu remains alive, Elango decides to use the time machine to return to the past and kill Kuzhandaivelu, even though he cannot return. But Kuzhandaivelu spots the duo and while fighting them, all three of them fall into the time machine and go to the past. In the past, Kuzhandaivelu destroys the time machine, but Elango manages to kill Kuzhandaivelu. Then, Elango and Arumugam stop themselves from finding the time machine by thwarting the accident involving them and Parthasarathy.

The next morning, Elango wakes up in a bed, remembering only the events of the previous night. He soon finds out, to his surprise, that he is in a marriage hall and that he will marry Anu on that day. He does not remember, to Anu's bewilderment, any of the events which had occurred in the past two months as a result of his usage of the time machine during that period. He finds out that, without finding the time machine, he got a job and managed to impress Rajarathinam with one of his business ideas, leading to his marriage with Anu. Arumugam, who also doesn't remember anything over the past two months, is happily married. Elango and Arumugam soon find out that Kuzhandaivelu had died two months ago, having been killed in the encounter. They also run into Parthasarathy, who does not recognise them as they had never met.

Since the time machine was never seen, it returned to 2065, making it a success.

Cast

Production
Principal photography lasted 43 days. The CG for this film was done by Phantom FX, a Chennai-based VFX Studio.

Music

The film's soundtrack album and background score were composed by Hiphop Tamizha. The soundtrack album consists of five tracks.

Release and reception
Indru Netru Naalai was released on 26 June 2015, and received positive reviews from critics. Baradwaj Rangan of The Hindu called it "A fun ride with a time machine". S. Saraswathi of Rediff.com gave the film 3.5/5 stars, praising the direction, screenplay, and performances of the cast members. She concluded by saying that Indru Netru Naalai is "worth watching". Behindwoods stated in its review that Indru Netru Naalai was "A well executed sci-fi film". The movie is also widely applauded for its minimal but perfect execution of visual effects, handled by PhantomFX. M. Suganth of The Times of India gave it 3.5/5 and appreciated the director's way of handling the film's theme.

Sequel
On 18 January 2021, the movie's sequel was announced with a special pooja ceremony. The filmmakers revealed that Vishal and Karunakaran have been retained for the sequel. It will be directed by debutant Karthik Ponraj SP with music composed by Ghibran. This film is to be CV Kumar's 25th production venture.

References

External links
 

2015 romantic comedy films
Indian romantic comedy films
2015 films
2015 directorial debut films
Films about time travel
Films scored by Hiphop Tamizha
2010s science fiction adventure films
2010s Tamil-language films
Indian science fiction comedy films
Films set in 2065
Films set in the 2060s
2010s science fiction comedy films